The High Sheriff of Belfast is a title and position which was created in 1900 under the Local Government (Ireland) Act 1898, with Sir James Henderson the first holder. Like other high sheriff positions, it is largely a ceremonial post today. The current high sheriff is Councillor John Hussey of the Democratic Unionist Party, who took office in 2022.

The high sheriff is theoretically the judicial representative of the King in the city, while the Lord Lieutenant of Belfast is the Sovereign's personal representative. Today, the office is now largely symbolic with few formal duties other than deputising for the Lord Mayor of Belfast at official events. Irish Nationalists and Republican council members generally do not allow their names to go forward for the nomination as the post is seen as a reflection of the city's imperialist past.

Appointments are made on annual basis by the Secretary of State for Northern Ireland, who asks the outgoing high sheriff and Belfast City Council to suggest the names of three people who are deemed suitable to hold the position. In recent years the council has suggested only one candidate, who is normally a member of the council. The high sheriff's term of office runs from January to December, which is distinct from the term of office for the lord mayor and deputy lord mayor who take up office in May or June each year.

Prior to 1900 sheriffs were elected by the city council.

List of high sheriffs

20th century

 1900: Sir James Henderson
 1901: Otto Jaffe
 1902: Samuel Lawther
 1903: Robert Anderson
 1904: Henry Hutton
 1905: Henry O'Neill
 1906: William Frederick Coates
 1907: Peter O'Connell
 1908: John McCaughey
 1909: Francis Curley
 1910: George Doran
 1911: Crawford McCullagh
 1912: James Johnston
 1913: Frank Workman
 1914: John Tyrrell
 1915: John Campbell White
 1916: Robert Dunlop
 1917: William Tougher
 1918: Cllr Robert M Gaffikin JP
 1919: Samuel Mercier
 1920: William George Turner
 1921: Joseph Davison
 1922: Councillor Henry McKeag
 1923: Alderman James Augustine Duff, M.P., J.P.
 1924: Councillor Hugh McLaurin JP
 1925: Councillor William Macartney
 1926: Alderman Oswald Jamison (Nationalist)
 1927: Samuel Cheyne
 1928: Julia McMordie
 1929: Samuel Hall-Thompson
 1930: James McKinney
 1931: C. Lindsay
 1932: F. J. Holland
 1933: Richard Milligan Harcourt
 1934: James Dunlop Williamson
 1935: George Ruddell Black
 1936: Thomas Edward McConnell
 1937: Thomas Loftus Cole?
 1938: Thomas Loftus Cole
 1939: Samuel Boyd Thompson
 1940: William Dowling
 1941: Percival Brown
 1942: Tommy Henderson
 1943: Frederick William Kennedy
 1944: Alfred Hinds
 1945: Robert Brown Alexander
 1946: Cecil McKee
 1947: W. E. G. Johnston
 1948: James Henry Norritt
 1949: Robert Harcourt
 1950: Stuart Knox Henry
 1951: William Harpur
 1952: Andrew Scott
 1953: Robert Pierce
 1954: William Frederick Neill
 1955?: Robert Kinahan
 1956: Walter H. Cooper
 1957: Herbert Jefferson
 1958: Florence Elizabeth Breakie
 1959: Martin Kelso Wallace
 1960: William Duncan Geddis
 1961: William Jenkins
 1962: William John McCracken
 1963: Joseph Foster Cairns
 1964: William Christie
 1965: John Abbott Lewis
 1966: Matthew Thomas Orr
 1967: Thomas Rea
 1968: Councillor Hugh Robert Brown
 June 1969-June 1970: Councillor Myles Humphreys
 June 1970-June 1971: Councillor John William Kennedy, O.B.E, J.P., M.P.
 June 1971-June 1972: Francis Wills Watson
 June 1972-June 1973: Alderman Walter Shannon
 June 1973–June 1974: Alderman Alfred Walker Shaw
 1975: Councillor James Stewart
 1976: Councillor William Cecil Corry
 1977: Councillor John Allen
 1978: Councillor John Carson
 1979: Councillor Grace Bannister
 1980: Alderman Michael Brown
 1981: Councillor Muriel Pritchard
 1982: Councillor Alfie Ferguson
 1983: Councillor Donnell Deeny
 1984: Councillor Pauline Whitley
 1985: Councillor Andrew Cairns
 1985–1986: Councillor Herbert Ditty
 1987–1989: Post vacant
 1990: Councillor Jim Kirkpatrick
 1991: Councillor Joe Coggle
 1992: Councillor Thomas Patton
 1993: Councillor Jim Walker
 1994: Councillor Mary Margaret Crooks
 1995: Councillor John Parkes
 1995: Councillor Joe Coggle
 1996: Councillor Steve McBride
 1997: Councillor Nelson McCausland
 1998: Councillor Jim Clarke
 1999: Councillor Robin Newton

21st century
 2000: Councillor Tom Campbell
 2001: Councillor Alan Crowe
 2002: Councillor Wallace Browne
 2003: Councillor Margaret Clarke
 2004: Councillor Ruth Patterson
 2005: Councillor David Browne
 2006: Councillor William Humphrey
 2007: Councillor Jim Kirkpatrick
 2008: Councillor Margaret McKenzie
 2009: Councillor Frank McCoubrey
 2010: Councillor Christopher Stalford
 2011: Councillor Ian Adamson
 2012: Alderman May Campbell
 2013: Councillor Brian Kingston
 2014: Councillor Lydia Patterson
 2015: Councillor Gareth McKee
 2016: Alderman Jim Rodgers
 2017: Alderman Thomas Haire 
 2018: Councillor Carole Howard 
 2019: Alderman Tommy Sandford 
 2020: Councillor Nicola Angela Verner 
 2021: Councillor Michael Andrew Long
 2022 Councillor John Hussey 
 2023 Councillor Samuel John Kyle[

See also
Members of Belfast City Council

References

 
Belfast
Local government in Belfast